Tyumen State University, also known as the University of Tyumen, is a comprehensive and research-intensive university in Tyumen, Russia. The University of Tyumen was the first university in Tyumen Oblast and was founded in 1930. Nowadays the UTMN consists of 15 institutes. The total number of students at the university is more than 27,000, including more than 1,900 international students. The total number of faculty and staff is more than 2,000. 
Today the UTMN trains specialists in 175 fields. The UTMN offers various forms of study: full-time, part-time, distance education, master's degree, undergraduate education, graduate, doctorate, advanced training, and second degree. The University is one of the participants of the Project 5-100 – the program of improving international competitiveness of the Russian institutions of higher education among the world's leading research and education centers. 

The University in 2022 was ranked #801-1,000 in the world in the QS World University Rankings, #1,201 in THE World University Rankings by Times Higher Education, #2,383 by Webometrics, and #2,496 by URAP World Ranking - University Ranking by Academic Performance.

Since 2013 Valeriy Falkov has been the rector of the UTMN. In January, 2020 Falkov was appointed as the Minister of Science and Higher Education of Russia.

History
The development of universal primary education created a desperate need for professional teaching staff, for which reason in 1930 the first Tyumen higher educational institution was founded. Students of the Agricultural and Pedagogical Institute of Tyumen could study agriculture, chemistry, biology and physics.

The second half of 1930s saw the start of academic research. In 1935, an experimental plot was created. Scientific expeditions to the north of the Altai, studies of indigenous northern language and folklore and regional teaching courses for locals took place from 1936-40.

Everything changed with the start of World War II in July 1941. During its first year, more than a hundred of students, professors and other staff members went to the front. Nevertheless, the Institute continued working. In February 1942, it hosted an academic conference where 20 papers in the fields of mathematics, chemistry, geography, psychology, literature, Russian language and anti-fascism  were presented. Among the participants were scientists from Boris Zbarsky's laboratory, who came to Tyumen as an escort to the mummy of Lenin that was being evacuated from Moscow. The head of the department of natural sciences, Ilya Zbarsky, was a senior research fellow of the laboratory.

In the 1960s, the fast development of West Siberian oil and gas industry influenced the Institute, which focused on finding the most effective ways of oil and gas extraction. 
On January 1, 1973, by the decision of the USSR Council of Ministers, the Pedagogical Institute became a State University. The first rector of the University was a doctor of Physics and Mathematics, Igor Aleksandrov.

Rankings
The University in 2022 was ranked #801-1,000 in the world in the QS World University Rankings, #1,201 in THE World University Rankings by Times Higher Education, #2,383 by Webometrics, and #2,496 by URAP World Ranking - University Ranking by Academic Performance.

Structure
The University of Tyumen has 15 academic institutes:
 Institute of Finance and Economics
 Institute of State and Law
 Institute of Mathematics and Computer Sciences
 Institute of Chemistry
 Institute of Physics and Technology
 Institute of Earth Sciences
 Institute of Biology
 Institute of Philology and Journalism
 Institute of History and Political Sciences
 Institute of Psychology and Pedagogy
 Institute of Physical Education
 Institute of Distance Education
 Institute of Environmental and Agricultural Biology (X-BIO)
 Regional Institute of International Cooperation
  School of Advanced Studies (SAS)

Overview
The UTMN campus includes classrooms, research centers, and laboratories. The main territory of the UT campus is located in the city of Tyumen. The student residences are located here as well. The Acting Rector of the UTMN (since April 2020) is Ivan Romanchuk. The University has more than 100 student associations. 

Within the Tempus Project, the International Center of Inclusive Education has been established. Equipment for persons with special needs was purchased with grant funds. The engineer of the International Competence Center of Inclusive Education developed the electronic textbook for blind people – SEEALL. The device enables obtaining writing skills and reading Braille, as well as sending text and audio messages from one module to another.

The development of international activity of the UTMN is based on cooperation with international partners in research, education, and cultural spheres. In 2016, the University had 84 cooperation agreements with international higher education institutions and organizations, seven of which were the world's leading universities featured in the Top 200 according to the international THE, QS and ARWU rankings. The result of the cooperation was joint events at an international level and implementation of research and educational projects.

The University holds 4 international summer schools:
 STEP in Russian Energy: Society, Technology, Environment, Policy – educational program for international students. 
 Western Siberia: Life, History and Culture. 
 Energy Policy in Eurasia is organized by the University of Tyumen in partnership with the European University at St. Petersburg.
 Explore your own Siberia.

Global Education
The University of Tyumen is one of the employers of the Russian government's Global Education Program, aimed at preparing Russian experts at an international level in the priority directions of development of the Russian economy. It allows Russian undergraduate, graduate and doctorate students choosing one of 288 universities in 32 countries and receive grants for studying in MA and PhD programs and residency (medicine) in the fields of engineering, education, social administration, medicine and science. The priority form is collaboration with major enterprises. Its focus is the regional economy, associated with an increase in the number of new industries and the need to provide the major investment projects and production sites of the West Siberian region with modern engineering and managerial staff. The Polytechnic School has been established in order to modernize the training of engineering and technical staff at the University.

Conceptual Engineering of the Oil and Gas Deposits Master’s Program
Currently, the UTMN Polytechnic School is the country's only educational platform preparing experts in conceptual engineering for the oil and gas sector. Partner of the Program is Gazprom Neft company.

Basic Department of Measurement of Oil and Gas Flow
The basic department is used for educational and research purposes. UTMN students participate in industrial projects for designing and implementing machinery and equipment for the development of oil and gas sites.

Notable alumni
 Dmitry Artyukhov - politician, governor of the Yamal-Nenets Autonomous District.
  – poet.
  – Soviet Moldavian geographer. 
 Sergey Savin – volleyball player, member of Russia men's national volleyball team and Russian club Lokomotiv Novosibirsk.
  – writer, journalist.
  – poet, journalist and educator.
 Galina Kukleva – biathlete, Olympic champion and three times world champion.
  – historian and writer.
 Aleksandr Moor - politician, governor of Tyumen Province.
  – actor, film director, producer and journalist.
  –politician. 
  – literature specialist and musician. 
  – Tyumen historian and ethnographer.
 Valery Falkov - politician, Minister of Science and Higher Education of Russia
 Vladimir Cheboksarov – former wrestler.
  – politician and journalist.
 Vladimir Yakushev – politician, Minister of Construction and Infrastructure of Russia.

References

External links

Education in Tyumen Oblast
Universities in Russia
Tyumen